Kitiseni Lopati  was a Tuvaluan politician who served as the minister of natural resources and commerce,  then as the minister of finance and commerce in the cabinet of prime minister Tomasi Puapua in his second term as prime minister of Tuvalu.
 
In September 1988, Lopati was appointed at the minister of finance and commerce to replaced Henry Naisali after he resigned his seat to take up the position of Secretary General of the South Pacific Forum. Lopati was not returned to parliament in the 1989 Tuvaluan general election.

He had earlier served as the Secretary of the Communications and Transport Department, and in 1979 he was made a Member of the Order of the British Empire (MBE).

Publications
	Kitiseni Lopati & Panapa Panapa (1968) A Vocabulary of English, Gilbertese, Ellice Common Usage, Antebuka, Gilbert Islands: Printed by the G.I.P.C.

References

Members of the Parliament of Tuvalu
People from Nanumea
Officers of the Order of the British Empire
Finance Ministers of Tuvalu
20th-century politicians